Origins of the Chinese Revolution, 1915-1949 is a French-language non-fiction book by Lucien Bianco, published in 1967, by Editions Gallimard. It was published in English in 1971, with Muriel Bell as the translator, by Stanford University Press. It analyzes the Chinese Communist Revolution.

Kozo Yamamura of Boston College described the work as a "survey book".

O. E. Westad of Yale University wrote that the book is "a mainstay of the debate about what brought the Communists to power."

Background
Bianco studied the governance of the Chinese Communist Party, characterized as a nationalist movement, despite Bianco's personal dislike of nationalism. Bianco discussed this in the postscript of the 2007 edition.

The research in the book was conducted in 1966.

A large majority of the research used in the making of this book was produced in the United States, and many of the studies cited were products of Columbia University and Harvard University.

Contents
The collapse of the Qing Dynasty and the May 4th Movement are in the opening portion of the book. The next portions discuss the development of the Chinese Communist Party.

Allan B. Cole of the Fletcher School of Law and Diplomacy described the work as focusing on "really big questions" about the Communist Revolution, "sketches [of] backgrounds and revolutionary periods" and on analyzing similarities and differences with the regime of the Soviet Union; this was in opposition to "a general and fairly thorough treatment of" the course of the history of the country.

Jean-Phillippe Béja stated that Bianco's "characterization of the regime is quite severe".

Release
In 2007 there was a new edition of the original French version.

It was published in English in 1971, with Muriel Bell as the translator, by Stanford University Press.

Its Japanese translation, 中国革命の起源 １９１５－１９４９, was published by University of Tokyo Press.

Reception
John K. Fairbank of Harvard University wrote that the book "brilliantly summarizes this whole subject" and that the work is "vivid and enlightening" due to the author's "mastery of the literature and the data of the historical record."

Sebastian Veg, in China Perspectives, wrote in 2008 that even though the process that the book studied had not been completed yet at the time the book was written, the book was able to succeed in "the test of time".

Harold Z. Schiffrin of Hebrew University wrote that it was "the best sungle analysis" due to it being "the most comprehensive, critical, and balanced" such work that has appeal for academics of all levels.

Béja praised the author's thorough citation of sources, with the "seriousness of his research" being "most striking", adding that "Not a single word is written without a reference to its source."

Cole stated that he felt "satisfaction" at seeing the French author use American sourcing, and that having a "legatee of the French Revolution, empires, and republics" create a work analyzing Chinese history was "interesting".

Yamamura stated that the book did not have "new insights", which "disappointed" Yamamura. Yamamura stated that the original French version at the book "has its place" with Francophone readers who had not yet specialized in the topic; at the time of Yamamura's review the English version had not yet been published.

See also
 Stalin and Mao - Another book by Bianco

References

Notes

Further reading
 
  - PDF version

External links
 Origins of the Chinese revolution, 1915-1949 (English version) - At the Internet Archive
 Origins of the Chinese Revolution, 1915-1949 - Stanford University Press
 Chapter 1, pages 1-16 (English version): hosted at CÉRIUM (Centre d’études et de recherches internationales) at the Université de Montréal
1967 books
Books about China
Stanford University Press books